Pehr Evind Svinhufvud's first senate was the first Senate and de facto Government of independent Finland. Its term spanned November 27, 1917 – May 27, 1918.

It sat in Vaasa during the Finnish Civil War from January 29 to May 3, 1918 and was known as the Vaasa Senate during that time.

Assembly 
The following table displays the Senate's composition:

References

Political history of Finland

ru:Сенат Финляндии